Oleksandr Ilyuschenkov (born 23 March 1990) is a Ukrainian professional footballer who plays as a goalkeeper for Karpaty Lviv.

Career
Ilyuschenkov is the product of the Ternopil academy system.

In July 2011, he signed a contract with FC Karpaty in the Ukrainian Premier League.

In December 2022, he signed a two-year contract with Karpaty Lviv.

Honours
Nyva Ternopil
 Ukrainian Second League: 2008–09

References

External links
 
Statistics at FFU website (Ukr)

1990 births
Living people
Sportspeople from Ternopil
Ukrainian footballers
Association football goalkeepers
FC Nyva Ternopil players
FC Enerhetyk Burshtyn players
FC Karpaty Lviv players
Ukrainian Premier League players
FC Tiraspol players
Ukrainian expatriate footballers
Expatriate footballers in Moldova
Ukrainian expatriate sportspeople in Moldova
FC Metalist Kharkiv players
FC Sioni Bolnisi players
NK Veres Rivne players
FC Rukh Lviv players
FC Lviv players
Expatriate footballers in Georgia (country)
Ukrainian expatriate sportspeople in Georgia (country)
Ukrainian First League players
Ukraine under-21 international footballers